Marist is an amateur association football club in Palmerston North, New Zealand playing in the Capital Football W-League (Women) and Central Football Federation League (Men). Formed in 1988, it is part of Palmerston North Marist Sports Club, a multi-sport organisation which caters for football, cricket, tennis, hockey, netball, rugby union, and squash.

The club's best performance in national competition came in the 2005 Chatham Cup. They reached the final, but were defeated by Auckland's Central United by two goals to one.

Staff and committee members

 Chairman: Jason Flynn
 Secretary: Megan Crawford
 Treasurer: Sharleen Millward
 Club Captain: Jason Crawford
 Men's First Team Coach: (vacant)
 Women's First Team Coach: Cameron Smith

References
1. UltimateNZSoccer website's Palmerston North Marist page

External links
Club website

Association football clubs in Palmerston North
Association football clubs established in 1939
1939 establishments in New Zealand